Breck may refer to:

People
 Daniel Breck (1788–1871), member of the U.S. House of Representatives from Kentucky
 Helena Breck, British actor
 James Lloyd Breck (1818–1876), priest, educator, and missionary of the Episcopal Church in the United States of America
 Joseph Berry Breck (1828–1865), officer in the United States Navy
 Julia Breck (1941–2020), British actress
 Peter Breck (1929–2012), American character actor
 Samuel Breck (general) (1834–1918), officer in the United States Army
 Samuel Breck (politician) (1771–1862), American politician from Pennsylvania

Other
 , a Clemson-class destroyer in the United States Navy
 Breck School, an independent college-preparatory preK–12 school in Golden Valley, Minnesota
 Breck Shampoo, American brand of shampoo